Edward Garvey may refer to:

Edward B. Garvey (1914–1999), U.S. hiker and author
Ed Garvey (1940–2017), U.S. politician

See also
Dan Edward Garvey (1886–1974)